The Bureau of Foreign Trade (BOFT) is the administrative agency of the Ministry of Economic Affairs (MOEA) of Taiwan (ROC).

History
In 1955, the Foreign Exchange and Trade Review Commission was established under the Executive Yuan. In 1968 and 1969, the Executive Yuan reorganized the commission by dividing the authority and operation of the commission among the Ministry of Finance, MOEA and Central Bank of China, respectively. The Bureau of Foreign Trade was subsequently established on January 1, 1969, under the MOEA to administer trade in general commercial goods.

Organizational structure
 Multilateral Trade Affairs Division (including WTO/APEC/GAMS/OECD)
 Bilateral Trade Division I
 Bilateral Trade Division II
 Trade Development Division
 Export/Import Administration Division
 Congressional Liaison Unit
 Planning Committee
 Trade Promotion Fund Management Committee, MOEA
 Office of Trade Security Controls
 Office of Exhibition Center Construction 
 Information Management Center
 Accounting Office
 Personnel Office
 Statistics Office
 Kaohsiung Office
 Civil Service Ethics Office

Transportation
BOFT is accessible within walking distance West from Chiang Kai-shek Memorial Hall Station of Taipei Metro.

Director-Generals
 Chang Chun-fu (– August 2014)
 Yang Jen-ni (20 August 2014 – August 2020)
 Cynthia Kiang (August 2020 – present)

See also
Ministry of Economic Affairs (Taiwan)

References

External links

 

1969 establishments in Taiwan
Executive Yuan
Foreign trade of Taiwan
Government agencies established in 1969